Thornton Heath is a ward in the London Borough of Croydon. The ward covers part of the Thornton Heath Area. The first election held under the new boundaries was the 2018 Croydon Council Election.

List of Councillors

Mayoral election results 
Below are the results for the candidate which received the highest share of the popular vote in the ward at each mayoral election.

Ward Results

Thornton Heath

References 

Wards of the London Borough of Croydon